The Democratic Turkish Union of Romania (UDTR; , RDTB) is an ethnic minority political party in Romania representing the Turkish community.

History
The party was created in 1990 as a split from the Turkish Muslim Democratic Union of Romania (which subsequently became an organisation solely for Romanian Tatars), and was initially named the Ethnic Turkish Minority Union of Romania (Uniunea Minoritară Etnică Turcă din România, UMETR). In the 1992 general elections the party received only 2,572 votes (0.02%), but won a single seat in the Chamber of Deputies under the electoral law that allows for political parties representing ethnic minority groups to be exempt from the electoral threshold. In December 1993 it adopted its current name, and has won a seat in every election since. The party also has representation on Constanța County Council.

Party logo
The logo of the Turkish Democratic Union of Romania is a globe that is the symbol of the Turkish ethnicity (crescent and star), being framed at the bottom by two olive branches, symbolizing peace. At the base of the globe is the name of the Turkish Democratic Union of Romania, framed by the Romanian tricolour, representing the support that the Romanian state gives to the Turkish ethnic group for the preservation of the spiritual-cultural-religious identity.

Policies
The main objective of the party is to protect and promote the ethno-cultural, linguistic and religious identity of its members:
 protection of ethnic identity, mainly language, literature, music, religion, traditions and material values;
 the protection of their own settlements and cultural places;
 maintenance of historical and architectural vestiges and monuments that mirror the past and sustainability;
 free expression of Islamic religious faith;
 developing a social protection system and development of social assistance programs of its members;
 cultivation and development of traditional Romanian-Turkish friendship relationships;
 promoting the image of the Turks with Romanian citizenship abroad.

Electoral history

Party presidents

References

External links
Official website

Non-registered political parties in Romania
Political parties of minorities in Romania
Turkish political parties
Political parties established in 1990
1990 establishments in Romania
Turks in Romania